When I Hit the Ground is the second studio album by American rock musician Ace Enders, using the name Ace Enders and a Million Different People. The album was released on 17 March 2009 through Vagrant Records. The album peaked at number 15 on the Top Heatseekers chart and number 44 on the Top Independent Albums chart.

Track listing
 "Reintroduction" – 2:24
 "Take the Money and Run" – 3:24
 "New Guitar" – 1:04
 "The Only Thing I Have (The Sign)" – 3:26
 "When I Hit the Ground" – 4:02
 "Reaction" – 4:02
 "Sweeter Light" – 4:19
 "S.O.S." – 2:55
 "Over This" – 3:33
 "Where Do We Go From Here" – 5:34
 "Emergency" – 4:17
 "Leader" – 4:37
 "Bring Back Love" – 4:28
 "Can't Run Away" – 3:37
 "From a Daze" (B-side) – 3:40

 The title track "When I Hit The Ground" has an acoustic rendition on the album "Dustin' Off the Ol' Guitar" by Ender's band I Can Make A Mess Like Nobody's Business.

References

External links
"When I hit the ground - Independent CD review"  Released  3 April 2009 

2009 albums
Ace Enders albums